Iman Mafi (born 9 July 1994) is a Norwegian professional footballer who plays as a left-back for Eliteserien club Jerv.

Early career
Iman Mafi was born in Kristiansand and played youth football in Norway for Jerv.

College career
Mafi played college soccer in the United States for the Gardner–Webb Runnin' Bulldogs where he scored 3 goals in 18 matches before transferring to the Clemson Tigers where he scored a goal in the 2015 NCAA Division I Men's Soccer Tournament, played in the 2015 NCAA Division I Men's Soccer Championship Game against Stanford, and took part in the 2017 MLS SuperDraft.

Club career

Jerv
Mafi made his Eliteserien debut for Jerv on 6 July 2022 against Molde at the Aker Stadion during the 2022 Eliteserien season.

Career statistics

Club

Honours

Individual
2013 Big South All-Freshman Team
2015 All-ACC Third Team
2015 All-ACC Academic Team

References

External links 
 

1994 births
Living people
Sportspeople from Kristiansand
Norwegian footballers
Iranian footballers
Norwegian people of Iranian descent
Sportspeople of Iranian descent
Association football defenders
Norwegian expatriate sportspeople in the United States
FK Jerv players
Clemson Tigers men's soccer players
Vindbjart FK players
Kongsvinger IL Toppfotball players
Norwegian Second Division players
Norwegian First Division players
Eliteserien players